La Foceicha is one of thirteen parishes (administrative divisions) in Teverga, a municipality within the province and autonomous community of Asturias, in northern Spain.  

The postal code is 33111.

References

Parishes in Teverga